The 2010 FIM Dansk Metal Danish Speedway Grand Prix was the fourth race of the 2010 Speedway Grand Prix season. It took place on June 5 at the Parken Stadium in Copenhagen, Denmark.

The Danish Grand Prix was won by Pole Jarosław Hampel, who beat Tomasz Gollob, Chris Harris and Hans N. Andersen in the final.

Riders 
Injured Emil Sayfutdinov will be replaced by first Qualified Substitutes Piotr Protasiewicz. The Speedway Grand Prix Commission nominated Leon Madsen as Wild Card, and Nicolai Klindt and Patrick Hougaard both as Track Reserves. The Draw was made on June 4 at 13:00 CEST by Hans Christian Schmidt, Danish Ministry of Transport.
 (3)  Emil Sayfutdinov → (19)  Piotr Protasiewicz

Heat details

Heat after heat 
 Hampel, Woffinden, Madsen, Protasiewicz
 Bjerre, Zetterstroem, Crump, Hancock
 Jonsson, Holder, Klindt, Pedersen (Holta - t)
 Gollob, Lindgren, Harris, Andersen
 Woffinden, Pedersen, Gollob, Crump
 Harris, Holta, Madsen, Hancock
 Jonsson, Andersen, Bjerre, Protasiewicz
 Holder, Hampel, Zetterstroem, Lindgren (Fx)
 Lindgren, Jonsson, Hancock, Woffinden
 Andersen, Crump, Holder, Madsen
 Zetterstroem, Harris, Pedersen, Protasiewicz
 Hampel, Bjerre, Holta, Gollob
 Bjerre, Harris, Holder, Woffinden
 Jonsson, Gollob, Madsen, Zetterstroem
 Crump, Lindgren, Holta, Protasiewicz
 Hampel, Andersen, Hancock, Pedersen
 Andersen, Holta, Zetterstroem, Woffinden (F4x)
 Bjerre, Pedersen, Lindgren, Madsen
 Gollob, Holder, Hancock, Protasiewicz
 Crump, Jonsson, Harris, Hampel
 Semi-finals:
 Andersen, Harris, Crump, Jonsson
 Hampel, Gollob, Bjerre, Holder (F4x)
 the Final
 Hampel, Gollob, Harris, Andersen

The intermediate classification

See also 
 motorcycle speedway

References 

Denmark
2010
2010 in Danish motorsport